Adam K is a 2017 American horror film directed by Joston Theney and starring Farrah Abraham.

Premise
"A day in the life of mild-mannered and seemingly good-natured auto insurance claims manager Adam Kraul. He sets out to be a do-gooder and make friends, however ends up with mutilated victims in his wake when his invitations for friendships are rejected."

Cast
 Farrah Abraham as Karen Simms
 Arielle Brachfeld as Janice Parson
 Emii as Tina
 Brinke Stevens as Mrs. Kraul
 Mindy Robinson as Detective Carli Mansfield
 Kristin Wall as Detective Kelsey Andrews
 Sarah Nicklin as Amanda Cole
 Nihilist Gelo as Detective Harry Grimes
 Edward Gusts as Michael Parson
 Ethan McDowell as Caleb Simms
 Michael Wayne Foster as Bradley Michaels
 John Charles Smith as Detective Maury Bovine
 Jason Bonell as Young Donnie Lee Simms
 Carlos Javier Castillo as Gerry Halloway
 Alan Smithee as Adam Kraul

Filming
Principal photography for the film began in September 2013. Filming was almost shut down in 2014 after reports to the Los Angeles Police Department of "cries for help" from two of the actresses in the film, Sarah Nicklin and Kristin Wall. The actresses were just acting out a scene; unbeknownst to residents in the area despite being made aware of the film's production by the director.

Release
Green Apple Entertainment released the film via Amazon on August 8, 2017.

References

External links 
 

2017 films
2017 horror films
2017 independent films
American independent films
American slasher films
American splatter films
2010s English-language films
2010s American films
2010s slasher films